Sialidase-2 is an enzyme that in humans is encoded by the NEU2 gene.

This gene belongs to a family of glycohydrolytic enzymes which remove sialic acid residues from glycoproteins and glycolipids. Expression studies in COS-7 cells confirmed that this gene encodes a functional sialidase. Its cytosolic localization was demonstrated by cell fractionation experiments.

References

Further reading

External links 
 PDBe-KB provides an overview of all the structure information available in the PDB for Human Sialidase-2 

Human proteins